Edwin A. Locke (born May 15, 1938) is an American psychologist and a pioneer in goal-setting theory. He is a retired Dean's Professor of Motivation and Leadership at the Robert H. Smith School of Business at the University of Maryland, College Park.  He was also affiliated with the Department of Psychology. As stated by the Association for Psychological Science, "Locke is the most published organizational psychologist in the history of the field. His pioneering research has advanced and enriched our understanding of work motivation and job satisfaction. The theory that is synonymous with his name—goal-setting theory—is perhaps the most widely-respected theory in industrial-organizational psychology. His 1976 chapter on job satisfaction continues to be one of the most highly-cited pieces of work in the field."

Locke is a proponent of global capitalism, was personally acquainted with the philosopher Ayn Rand, and is affiliated with the Ayn Rand Institute.

He is also a critic of the concept of emotional intelligence. In recent years, he has become an outspoken opponent of the animal rights movement, especially the organization People for the Ethical Treatment of Animals.  In a winter 2010 interview with Imagineer magazine, he stated, "I don’t think PETA want all beings equal at all; I think they want man to suffer and die."

Academia
Locke graduated high school from Phillips Exeter Academy. He obtained his bachelor's degree in Psychology from Harvard in 1960. Two years later, at Cornell, he earned his master's degree in Industrial Psychology and Experimental Psychology, followed by his PhD in Industrial and Organizational Psychology in 1964. Locke's dissertation was on the relationship of intentions to motivation and affect.
In 1964, he took a position as an associate research scientist with the American Institutes for Research (AIR), where he remained as a research scientist from 1966 - 1970.

In 1967, he became an assistant professor of psychology in the University of Maryland. In 1970, he became associate professor of Business Administration in the University of Maryland. Between 1972 and 2001, he held a number of posts at the University of Maryland: 1972–2001, Professor of Business and Management, and of Psychology; 1984–1996; chair, Management and Organization Faculty; 1998–2001, Dean's Professor of Leadership and Motivation. Since 2001, Locke has been Professor Emeritus at the University of Maryland.

Theories

The Goal Setting Theory
Goal Setting Theory was developed by Locke in 1968 to explain human behavior in specific work situations. The theory argues that goals and intentions are cognitive and willful.

The two key findings of this theory are that setting specific goals (e.g., I want to earn $500 more a month) leads to higher performance than setting nonspecific, "do best" goals (e.g., I want to earn more money), and that goal difficulty is linearly and positively related to performance, such that, the harder the goal, the greater the effort, focus, and persistence, which results in higher performance. Goals are proposed to mediate the influence of incentives and feedback on performance. The model has spawned a large body of research, most of which has supported these predictions.

Goals have two characteristics: content, and intensity. Content refers to the chosen achievement (e.g., I want to form a loving relationship). Intensity refers to the quantity of physical and mental resources needed to create or achieve the content. The original model proposed by Locke consisted of five steps: Environmental Stimuli → Cognition → Evaluation → Intentions/ Goal Setting → Performance.

Sub-principles of Goal-setting
1) Set challenging specific goals

2) Provide feedback in relation to goals

3) Gain goal commitment

4) Provide resources needed to attain the goal

5) Learning vs performance goals

6) Environmental uncertainty

7) Stretch Goals

Prime Mover Theory 
Professor Locke also developed a model of successful business people.  This model is based on observations of success, such as of Walt Disney, Sam Walton, and Mary Kay. In successful people, seven traits were observed at high levels:

 Independent vision
 An active mind
 Competence and confidence
 The drive to action
 Egoistic passion
 Love of ability in others
 Virtue

Awards
 The Distinguished Scientific Contribution Award from the Academy of Management (Human Resources Division)
 Outstanding Teacher-Scholar Award from the University of Maryland
 James Mckeen Cattell Fellow Award, Association for Psychological Science.

Attainments
Locke is a fellow of the American Psychological Association, the Association for Psychological Science, 
the Academy of Management, the Society for Industrial & Organizational Psychology, and the Society for Organizational Behavior.

References

External links
Professor Locke's home page

Living people
Cornell University alumni
Critics of animal rights
Harvard University alumni
Objectivists
University of Maryland, College Park faculty
1938 births
21st-century American psychologists
Ayn Rand Institute
20th-century American psychologists